Code Black is an American medical drama, starring Marcia Gay Harden and Rob Lowe, that premiered on CBS on September 30, 2015. The series follows the understaffed, busy emergency room of Angels Memorial Hospital, which lacks sufficient resources. On May 16, 2016, the show was renewed for a second season, which premiered on September 28, 2016. On May 14, 2017, CBS renewed the show for a third season. On May 24, 2018 CBS canceled the series after three seasons.

Series overview

Episodes

Season 1 (2015–16)

Season 2 (2016–17)

Season 3 (2018)

Ratings

References

External links

Lists of American drama television series episodes
Lists of medical television series episodes